This World Is Not My Home is the first studio album from Onward to Olympas. Facedown Records released the album on January 19, 2010. Onward to Olympas worked with Jamie King, in the production of this album.

Critical reception

Rating the album seven out of ten for Cross Rhythms, Peter John Willoughby writes, "they have cultivated their sound, blending progressive metal, straight hardcore, and elements of death metal ... The guitar work is much more technical than I have come to expect from most hardcore/metalcore bands." Scott Fryberger, awarding the album four stars from Jesus Freak Hideout, states, "Onward To Olympas have an album on their hands that is definitely one of the best on all of Facedown." Giving the album four stars at Indie Vision Music, Michael Mayer III says, "Onward to Olympas have released one of the better albums in the genre in recent memory." Eric Burnet, awarding the album four and a half stars by The New Review, describes, "Wow, I did not expect to be praising this album so highly." Ronak Ghorbani, writing a review for Exclaim!, says, "Onward to Olympas deliver a solid first release with The World Is Not My Home."

Track listing

Credits
Onward To Olympas
 Justin Allman - Bass
 Matt Burnside - Drums
 Justin Gage - Guitar, Vocals
 Andrew Higginbotham - Guitar
 Kramer Lowe - Vocals

Additional Musicians
 Taisha Beathea - Vocals
 Nick Helvey - Piano
 Nathan Moore - Vocals

Production
 Jamie King - Engineer, Mastering, Mixing, Producer
 Dave Quiggle - Artwork, Cover Art, Layout

References

2010 debut albums
Facedown Records albums
Onward to Olympas albums
Albums produced by Jamie King (record producer)